Believe What You Like: What happened between the Scientologists and the National Association for Mental Health (Andre Deutsch Limited, 1973), written by the New Statesman director C. R. Hewitt under the pen name C. H. Rolph, details a public dispute between the Church of Scientology and the National Association for Mental Health (now known as Mind) in Britain.

Main points
The book covers the controversy of how, starting in 1969, members of the Church joined the NAMH in large numbers with the intent to change the organization from the inside. The Scientologists attempted to ratify as official policy a number of points concerning the treatment of psychiatric patients, and in so doing, secretly promoted Scientology's anti-psychiatry agenda. When their identity was realized, the Scientologists were expelled from the organization en masse, but later sued the NAMH over the matter in the High Court in 1971 and lost. The case was important in UK charity law.

The book also covers the origins and activities of the Church of Scientology in the UK and some of their other legal actions in the UK around that time, including:

 The libel case against Geoffrey Johnson Smith.
 Hubbard's legal difficulties getting Saint Hill Manor registered as a place of religious worship.
 The Church's libel suit against two Melbourne judges, Justice Kevin Anderson and Judge Gordon Just.
 Scientology front organizations called the Campaign Against Psychiatric Atrocities and AHDA (Association For Health Development And Aid).

See also

 Scientology and psychiatry
Enquiry into the Practice and Effects of Scientology
Kenneth Robinson
Fair Game

External links
Believe What You Like: What happened between the Scientologists and the National Association for Mental Health (complete text)
Cecil Hewitt Rolph, British Library of Political and Economic Science

Books critical of Scientology
Books about Scientology
1973 non-fiction books
Works published under a pseudonym
Scientology and psychiatry
1973 in religion